María Elisa Velázquez Gutiérrez is a Mexican sociologist, anthropologist, researcher, professor, and author. She is noted for her work concerning the history and culture of Mexican people of African descent (afrodescendientes in Spanish). She appeared as a historical consultant in "Mexico & Peru: The Black Grandma in the Closet", an episode of the PBS series Black in Latin America, hosted by Henry Louis Gates.

Works
Juan Correa, mulato libre, maestro pintor (1998)
Mujeres de origen africano en la capital novohispana, siglos XVII y XVIII (2006)
La huella negra en Guanajuato. Retratos de afrodescendientes de los siglos XIX y XX (2007)
Afrodescendientes en México, una historia de silencio y discriminación (2012)

References

Living people
Mexican anthropologists
Mexican women anthropologists
Mexican sociologists
Mexican women sociologists
Year of birth missing (living people)